Ajay Mehra (born 1969) is an Indian former first-class cricketer and sports commentator. During his playing career he represented Punjab and Rajasthan. His father Vijay Mehra played Test cricket for India.

Early and personal life
Mehra was born in 1969 in Delhi to Vijay Mehra, an international cricketer, and Kusum Mehra, a professor at Lady Sriram College in Delhi. He has a sister.

Career
A right-handed batsman, Mehra made his first-class debut for Punjab at the age of 20 during the 1989–90 Ranji Trophy. He played most of his cricket for Punjab, before finishing his career with a two-season stint with Rajasthan between 1998/99 and 1999/00. He also played for Rest of India team in the 1994–95 Irani Cup, Board President's XI in a first-class match against England A in 1995 and North Zone in the 1995–96 Duleep Trophy. He scored more than 2000 runs in 46 first-class appearances, with five centuries.

Mehra took to sports commentary after his playing days and worked as a commentator for several networks such as Doordarshan, ESPN India and Neo Sports. Apart from cricket, he also did commentary on kabaddi and Pro Wrestling League.

References

External links
 
 

1969 births
Living people
Indian cricketers
Punjab, India cricketers
Rajasthan cricketers
North Zone cricketers
Indian cricket commentators